WKBK (1290 AM) is a radio station broadcasting a news/talk format. Licensed to Keene, New Hampshire, United States, the station is currently owned by Saga Communications (through its Monadnock Radio Group) and licensed to Saga Communications of New England, LLC and features programming from CBS News Radio, NBC News Radio, Compass Media Networks, Salem Radio Network, and Westwood One.

History

WKBK originally signed on as WNBX on June 2, 1927, in Springfield, Vermont. The station operated at 1240kHz. In November 1928, the frequency was changed to 1260kHz. On December 25, 1940, WNBX signed on from its new location as WKNE. The move to Keene also brought an increase in power to 5,000 watts.  In 1941 as part of the NARBA shift, WKNE shifted to its permanent home on 1290 AM. In early 2002, WKNE was sold to Saga Communications, along with sister station WKNE-FM. In 2002, Saga Communications also purchased WKBK 1220 AM, the other AM signal in the Keene radio market, which began the steps for a change in for the impending format flips. In late 2002, Saga Communications moved the talk programming from weaker signaled WKBK to 1290, changing the call sign to WKBK. 1220 would pick up the call sign WZBK with the adult standards format (which was later dropped for a simulcast of WKVT in Brattleboro, Vermont).

Translator

WKBK began broadcasting on its FM translator, W281AU, on May 16, 2008, after a decision by the Federal Communications Commission.  In January 2009, the FM simulcast was dropped and 104.1 became "Keene Classics 104.1", playing a classic rock format.  WKBK was returned to the 104.1 FM frequency in May 2009. W281AU transmits 59 watts from the tower of sister station WZBK.

Until December 2018, WKBK was heard on FM translator W298BT (107.5 FM). This translator was converted to a soft adult contemporary station, fed via the HD2 channel of WKNE, after WKBK signed on a new translator, W231DV (94.1 FM); this translator was obtained in an FCC filing window that requires W231DV to permanently be associated with WKBK.

References

External links

Monadnock Broadcasting Group

KBK
News and talk radio stations in the United States
Keene, New Hampshire
Radio stations established in 1927